William Barnwell (born 1943) is an American author of science fiction, and of other genres. He has written the Blessing Trilogy, set in a future Ireland, and which has metaphysical content. It was praised by Andre Norton, while Peter Nicholls stated that Barnwell wrote like "a member of a pseudoscience cult." In 1985, Barnwell wrote Book of the Romes, a prequel to the Blessing Trilogy, a historical novel with science fiction/fantasy elements.

Partial bibliography
The Blessing Papers, UK: Colin Smythe, 1979. US: Pocket Books, 1980
Imram, Timescape Books/Pocket Books, 1981
The Sigma Curve, Timescape/Pocket Books, 1981
Book of the Romes, 1985

See also
Immram

References
The Encyclopedia of Science Fiction, page 92.

External links
Fantastic Fiction: The books of William Barnwell

Barnwell website
Encyclopedia of Science Fiction article by Peter Nicholls

1943 births
Living people
20th-century American novelists
20th-century American male writers
American male novelists
American science fiction writers